Alfonso Cruz Rodríguez (born 23 February 1988 in Salamanca, Castile and León), known as Sito, is a Spanish footballer who plays for Real Ávila CF as a right back.

External links
Unionistas official profile 

1988 births
Living people
Sportspeople from Salamanca
Spanish footballers
Footballers from Castile and León
Association football defenders
Segunda División players
Segunda División B players
Tercera División players
UD Salamanca players
CD Guijuelo footballers
Unionistas de Salamanca CF players